Lhasa is a city in the Tibet Autonomous Region of China.

Lhasa may also refer to:

Places
 Lhasa (prefecture-level city), the larger administrative unit that includes the city of Lhasa
 Lhasa Gonggar Airport
 Lhasa railway station
 Lhasa West railway station
 Lhasa River, a river of Tibet
 Lhasa terrane, a geologic terrain in Tibet
 Lhasa Nunatak, a rock ridge in Antarctica

Other uses
 7859 Lhasa, a minor planet
 Lhasa de Sela (1972–2010), American-born singer-songwriter
 Lhasa (album), 2009 album by Lhasa de Sella
 Lhasa (computing), the name of two different computer programs
 Lhasa Apso, a dog breed
 Chinese destroyer Lhasa

See also
 Lahsa (disambiguation)
 Lasa (disambiguation)
 Lassa (disambiguation)